Nasiri may refer to:

 Ahmad ibn Khalid al-Nasiri, Moroccan writer
 Mohamed Ali al-Nasiri, Iraqi journalist
 Mohammed al-Makki al-Nasiri, Moroccan writer
 Moharam Khan Nasiri, member of the Meshrano Jirga
 The Nasiri dynasty
 Omar Nasiri, Moroccan spy 
 Mohammad Nassiri, Iranian weightlifter, 1968 Olympic champion, world, Asian and Asian games champion.
 Al-bu Nasir, Iraqi arab tribe of which Saddam Hussein is a member.

See also
 Naciri, a surname

Arabic-language surnames